Persona Non Grata is the eleventh studio album by American thrash metal band Exodus, released on November 19, 2021. It is their first studio album since Blood In, Blood Out in 2014, and their second to feature vocalist Steve "Zetro" Souza since he returned to the band that same year. This album also features guest appearances from former Exodus guitarist Rick Hunolt and guitarist Lee Altus' bandmate in Heathen, Kragen Lum, who both provide guitar solos on one of the album's tracks, "Lunatic-Liar-Lord".

Plans for the follow-up to Blood In, Blood Out were made as early as 2016, and work on the album had been slowed down by relentless tour schedules and guitarist Gary Holt's commitments with Slayer, until the latter disbanded in 2019 following a farewell tour; as such, it is the first Exodus studio album to be released since Slayer's disbandment. The recording sessions of Persona Non Grata took place from September to October of 2020, with the album being fully completed in January 2021. The album was initially set for release in the summer of 2021, but it was pushed back to November, due to drummer Tom Hunting's diagnosis with squamous cell carcinoma of the stomach.

Background
After leaving Exodus in 2004 amid a bitter feud between himself and guitarist Gary Holt, frontman Steve "Zetro" Souza returned to the band in June 2014, and appeared on their tenth studio album Blood In, Blood Out, released four months later. The album received positive reviews and the band spent more than two years touring behind it. When asked in a June 2016 interview with The Age of Metal when Exodus were going to release a new album, Souza said, "I hate to speak for everybody, because one of our members [guitarist Gary Holt] plays in Slayer, which is very important to us and to him as well. And, actually, Gary is the main songwriter and has always been in Exodus. And so we'll have to, obviously, look at his schedule, but just having, actually, conversations with him since we've been home [off the road] and conversations with Tom, I mean, we know we need to keep new music going. And 2017 would be… Say it was towards the end of 2017… That would be three years since my return [to the band] and three years since Blood In, Blood Out came out. So I think that's fair to say you should be able to put a record out in that amount of time. And we've always been able to write an album in an… like, come home and concentrate on it, and within five or six months, we have it written and done — even less [time] than that. We know what we're doing. We know Exodus. We've been doing this for so many years. It's just like getting on a bicycle and riding it."

In a May 2017 interview with Metal Wani, Souza stated that Exodus would enter the studio around October or November to begin recording their eleventh studio album for a March 2018 release. Drummer Tom Hunting added, "We're just structuring songs right now. I think we've probably got five or six maybe, and the makings for the rest of 'em — bits and pieces here and there." Souza explained that the material did not sound like a continuation of Blood In, Blood Out but rather "a lot of records put together, I think.", later describing it as "heavy as shit, though — really fucking heavy." Writing for the album had continued by January 2018. Souza later went on to say that fans would have to wait until at least the end of 2019 for the release of new studio album, mainly due to Holt's commitment to Slayer's farewell tour. He then said that the new album would possibly be released in late 2019 or early 2020, promising that the album would be "very violent and very heavy".

In June 2020, Exodus announced that they would begin recording their follow-up to Blood In, Blood Out in September; pre-production of the album had begun a month earlier. In November 2020, it was announced the title of the album would be Persona Non Grata and was planned for release the following summer. In April 2021, very shortly after drummer Tom Hunting revealed that he had been diagnosed with cancer, Souza announced that the release of the album had been pushed back to November, though as reasons he cited both Hunting's illness and vinyl manufacturing issues due to the COVID-19 pandemic.

On August 20, 2021, Exodus announced that Persona Non Grata would be released on November 19, and its lead single "The Beatings Will Continue (Until Morale Improves)" was released on the same day through streaming services. On September 17, 2021, Exodus released the second single from Persona Non Grata, titled "Clickbait". On October 15, 2021, Exodus released the third single from Persona Non Grata, titled "The Years of Death and Dying". On November 19, 2021, the official release date of Persona Non Grata, Exodus released the album's fourth and final single, titled "Prescribing Horror".

Critical reception

Persona Non Grata has received highly positive reviews.

It was elected by Loudwire as the 23rd best rock/metal album of 2021. The publication also elected "The Beatings Will Continue (Until Morale Improves)" as the 11th best metal song of the same year.

Track listing
All lyrics and music written by Gary Holt except where noted.

Personnel

Exodus
 Steve "Zetro" Souza – lead vocals
 Gary Holt – guitars, backing vocals
 Lee Altus – guitars
 Jack Gibson – bass
 Tom Hunting – drums, backing vocals

Additional musicians
 Rick Hunolt – lead guitar on "Lunatic-Liar-Lord", backing vocals
 Kragen Lum - lead guitar on "Lunatic-Liar-Lord"
 Cody Souza – backing vocals
 Nick Souza – backing vocals

Charts

References

Exodus (American band) albums
2021 albums
Nuclear Blast albums